"Fast Life" is the second single from American hip hop artist Kool G Rap's 1995 album 4,5,6, featuring Nas Escobar. Released with the song "4,5,6" as a B-side, it later also featured on the compilation album Greatest Hits (2002).

Background
Produced by Buckwild, "Fast Life" is a track that glorifies the criminal lifestyle with Kool G Rap and Nas Escobar portraying themselves as powerful and wealthy cocaine kingpins, boasting of their luxurious possessions and ruthless efficiency. The Mafioso theme of "Fast Life" is set early as the song opens with a sound bite from the 1983 film Scarface (Al Pacino's Tony Montana saying "The time has come, we gotta expand, the whole operation. Distribution, New York, to Chicago, L.A. We gotta set our own market, and enforce it.") and Nas later references such mob figures as Lucky Luciano, Bugsy Siegel and Frankie Yale. G Rap and Nas go line for line in the third and final verse of the song which Complex has described as "mind-blowing". The song's chorus goes as follows:
Livin the fast life, in fast cars
Everywhere we go, people know who we are
A team from out of Queens with the American Dream
So we're plottin' up a scheme to get the seven figure C.R.E.A.M.

Speaking of his collaboration with fellow Queens rapper Nas in a 2014 interview, Kool G Rap stated:

Music video
The music video for "Fast Life" was directed by Brian "Black" Luvar and shows Kool G Rap and Nas Escobar living lavishly as they plot the construction of a mythical "Fast Life Hotel and Casino".

Samples
"Fast Life" samples the following songs:
"Trackin' Shoes" by A.B. Skhy
"Happy" by Surface

And was later sampled on:
"Jam" by A Tribe Called Quest featuring Consequence
"Still Strugglin'" by Raekwon
"Gunz From Italy" by Club Dogo featuring Kool G Rap
"Fast Life" by Bassi Maestro
"Fast Lane" by Vado featuring Raekwon
"AutumnLeaves" by Bones (rapper)

Track listing

12"
A-side
"Fast Life" (Original) (4:54)
"Fast Life" (Instrumental) (4:54)
"Fast Life" (Acapella) (3:52)

B-side
"4,5,6" (Original) (3:20)
"4,5,6" (Instrumental) (3:20)

CD
"Fast Life" (Original) (4:54)
"Fast Life" (Instrumental) (4:54)
"Fast Life" (Acapella) (4:50)
"4,5,6" (Original) (3:20)
"4,5,6" (Instrumental) (3:20)

Charts

References

External links
"Fast Life" at Discogs

1995 songs
1995 singles
Kool G Rap songs
Nas songs
Cold Chillin' Records singles
Mafioso rap songs
Music videos directed by Brian Luvar
Song recordings produced by Buckwild (music producer)
Songs about crime
Songs about drugs
Songs written by Kool G Rap
Songs written by Nas
Songs written by Ed Townsend